Mt. Olivet Cemetery is a cemetery administered by the Roman Catholic Archdiocese of Milwaukee. It was established in 1907 on the south side of Milwaukee, Wisconsin. Located at 3801 West Morgan Avenue, the cemetery is one of seven cemeteries in the Archdiocese of Milwaukee Catholic Cemeteries (AOMCC) System. The  property holds over 27,000 in-ground burials in traditional graves and above-ground entombments and inurnments in crypts and niches. In 2006, a mausoleum expansion project of over 2,000 new crypts and over 600 niches began.

Notable interments
 John C. Brophy - politician
 James Groppi - civil rights activist
 Dan Lally – Major League Baseball player
 Don Marion – Major League Baseball player

See also
 Calvary Cemetery, Milwaukee, Wisconsin

External links
Catholic cemeteries of the Archdiocese of Milwaukee

Cemeteries in Wisconsin
Buildings and structures in Milwaukee
Roman Catholic Archdiocese of Milwaukee
Roman Catholic cemeteries in Wisconsin
Tourist attractions in Milwaukee
Protected areas of Milwaukee County, Wisconsin
1907 establishments in Wisconsin